Smith's Pharmacy is a historic commercial building located in the East End section of Newport News, Virginia. It is a two-story brick building. The first floor was built in 1946 to house the pharmacy with the second floor being added in 1952 to serve as office space.  The interior of the first floor remains virtually unaltered with the original pharmaceutical retail space, counters, soda fountain and wooden booths.  It was the pharmacy of Dr. Charles Calvin Smith, an African-American pharmacist who established the store to serve that community in Newport News. He opened the first black owned pharmacy in Newport News in 1921. The Smith's Pharmacy was sold to the Eckerd Corporation in 1999.

It was listed on the National Register of Historic Places in 2002.

References

African-American history of Virginia
Commercial buildings on the National Register of Historic Places in Virginia
Commercial buildings completed in 1952
Buildings and structures in Newport News, Virginia
National Register of Historic Places in Newport News, Virginia
Pharmacies on the National Register of Historic Places